Giuseppe Manini (1750 - 1834) was an Italian priest and historian of Ferrara.

He was born in Ferrara, and became canon in the Cathedral of Ferrara. Among his writings were:

Studio dell'uomo ne' suoi rapporti con Dio (1788)
Il capo di famiglia istruito nell verita della fede, della morale  e del culto religioso (1804)
Compendio della storia sacra e politica di Ferrara (18038 , 6 volumes)
Sullo spirito della democrazia filosofica in materia di religione e costumi (1816)
Il secondo ed ultimo tempio della nazione giudaica (1819)

References

1750 births
1834 deaths
19th-century Italian writers
19th-century Italian historians
Italian priests
People from Ferrara